Gergana Dimitrova (Bulgarian Cyrillic: Гергана Димитрова) (born on 28 February 1996) is an international volleyball player from Bulgaria. She currently plays for Bulgaria as an outside hitter.

She competed at the 2017 FIVB Volleyball Women's U23 World Championship, 2015 FIVB Volleyball World Grand Prix, 2016 FIVB Volleyball World Grand Prix, 2015 European Games in Baku, and 2021 Women's European Volleyball League, winning a gold medal.

At club level she plays for RC Cannes in 2015.

References 

Bulgarian women's volleyball players
Bulgarian expatriate sportspeople in Switzerland
1996 births
Living people
European Games competitors for Bulgaria
Outside hitters
Volleyball players at the 2015 European Games